Yunist Stadium is a football stadium in Horishni Plavni. For the 2008-09 season of Ukrainian Second League, the stadium was a home arena for FC Hirnyk-Sport Komsomolsk and FC Kremin Kremenchuk.

References

External links
 Younist Stadium

Football venues in Poltava Oblast
FC Kremin Kremenchuk
FC Hirnyk-Sport Horishni Plavni
Sports venues in Poltava Oblast